Okrog is a small settlement south of Gabrovka in the Municipality of Litija in central Slovenia. The area is part of the traditional region of Lower Carniola. It is now included with the rest of the municipality in the Central Sava Statistical Region. The settlement is known as Ukrog in the local dialect. It includes the hamlet of Dule (in older sources also Dole).

References

External links
Okrog on Geopedia

Populated places in the Municipality of Litija